Netivot ("paths") is a city in the Southern District of Israel located between Beersheba and Gaza.

History

Netivot was founded in 1956  and named after the bible: "All her paths are peace." (Proverbs 3:17) Initially a ma'abara, it was later transformed into a development town. The first residents were immigrants from Morocco and Tunisia. In the 1990s, they were joined by immigrants from Russia and Ethiopia. For many years, Netivot suffered from high unemployment. Since 2008, Netivot has been the target of Grad missile attacks from Gaza. In 2012, a rocket exploded near a school in the city.

A major landmark is the tomb of the Baba Sali (1889–1984), a Moroccan-born kabbalist who is buried there.

Demographics

In 2001, the ethnic make-up of the city was 99.9% Jewish, with no significant Arab population, and the population was evenly divided between males and females. The city ranked relatively low in the socio-economic index (3 out of 10). In the wake of Operation Solomon, Netivot absorbed a large number of Ethiopian Jewish immigrants.

By the end of 2009, Netivot had a population of 26,700.

Education
According to the Central Bureau of Statistics, there were 22 schools and 4,243 students in the city: 16 elementary schools with 3,053 students, and 11 high schools with 1,190 students. 43.1% of 12th grade students were entitled to a Bagrut matriculation certificate in 2001. Netivot schools have been chosen for a special pilot project in which elementary school children build their own mini-robots.

In 2009, a high school student from Netivot won first prize in the First Step to Nobel Prize in Physics competition. 

In 2011, Netivot hosted a robotics festival sponsored by the international organization FIRST - For Inspiration and Recognition of Science and Technology. First, second, and third graders at the Noam Eliyahu religious school in Netivot spend eight hours a week studying science and robotics at Lehava, the municipal science center.

The Mandel Center for Leadership in the Negev (MCLN) runs a two-year community-based leadership program in Netivot.

Transportation 

Netivot is accessible by Highway 34, Highway 25 and Route 232.

The Ashkelon–Beersheba railway, a new railway line which connected Netivot with Tel Aviv and Beersheba, was inaugurated in February 2015. The Netivot railway station located on the western outskirts of the city, was opened on February 15, 2015. A bus terminal is located adjacent to the station.

Local culture
Netivot is known for being the home of Jewish mystics and as a popular pilgrimage site. The growth of mysticism and sacred sites in Netivot led to it being dubbed the "Varanasi of Israel". The most prominent rabbis in Netivot include Baruch Abuhateizra, Yaakov Israel Ifergan and Yoram Abergel. On the anniversary of the Baba Sali's death, thousands of pilgrims come to Netivot to visit his tomb.

Eleven local newspapers are published in the city.

Three successful nightclubs have opened in Netivot which also draw clientele from out of town, attracting young people from Ashkelon, Beersheba, Omer, Lehavim, Ofakim, and Sderot.

Future development 

Two additional neighborhoods with a total of 3,600 new housing units are planned for Netivot. They are expected to double the city's population. Two large supermarkets are also planned for the city, in addition to the seven already built there.

Industry
There are 24 plants and factories located in a nearby industrial park, mostly in food processing, metals, plastics, and construction sectors. There are an additional 15 factories located in the city in some of the same sectors as above, and also chemical and mineral sectors.

References

External links
Netivot profile, Nefesh B'nefesh
 

Cities in Israel
Development towns
Jewish pilgrimage sites
Gaza envelope
Populated places in Southern District (Israel)
Populated places established in 1956
1956 establishments in Israel
Cities in Southern District (Israel)